Paradise Point, on the Arabian Sea, is a beach in Karachi, Sindh, Pakistan. Paradise Point is a sandstone rock promontory which once had a natural arch.

The beach has attractions for families and tourists, including beachside horse and camel rides, amusement parks, restaurants, and swimming in the Arabian Sea. Paradise Point Beach is accessible through Mauripur Road (formerly Hawkes Bay Road) or the Mubarak Goth Road from Karachi. Nathiagali Beach is located west of Paradise Point beach.

Other beaches close to the city include Sandspit Beach, Hawke's Bay, and Clifton Beach.

Karachi Nuclear Power Plant
The Karachi Nuclear Power Plant is located near Paradise Point.

See also
 Karachi Nuclear Power Plant

References

External links

Beaches of Karachi
Natural arches
Landforms of Pakistan
Collapsed arches